Gilbert Stanley Underwood (1890–1960) was an American architect best known for his National Park lodges.  Born in 1890, Underwood received his B.A. from Yale in 1920 and a M.A. from Harvard in 1923.  After opening an office in Los Angeles that year, he became associated with Daniel Ray Hull, a landscape architect, of the National Park Service.  This led to a commission with the Utah Parks Company of the Union Pacific Railroad which was developing the parks in hopes of producing destinations for travelers.  During this time Underwood designed lodges for Cedar Breaks National Monument (now demolished), Zion National Park, Bryce Canyon National Park, and the North Rim of the Grand Canyon National Park. His surviving Utah Parks Company buildings are considered exceptional examples of the Rustic style of architecture, and are all listed on the National Register of Historic Places. In addition, Underwood was contracted to design Yosemite National Park's The Ahwahnee, also on the National Register and probably his greatest triumph in the Rustic style.

Underwood also designed stations for the Union Pacific, culminating in the magnificent Art Deco style station in Omaha in 1931.  Then Underwood joined the Federal Architects Project in 1932.  While working for the federal government, Underwood produced the preliminary designs for the Timberline Lodge, Mount Hood, Oregon, and went on to design more than 20 post offices, two major federal buildings, and the U.S. State Department Building.  From 1947 to 1949, he was appointed as federal supervisory architect.

Following retirement but utilizing an association with John D. Rockefeller, Jr., and the Williamsburg Lodge project in Virginia, Underwood designed as his last major commission the Jackson Lake Lodge (1950–1954), Grand Teton National Park, Wyoming.  He died in 1960.

Underwood's works include:
 Old Faithful Lodge, Yellowstone National Park - completed 1923
 Cedar Breaks Lodge, Cedar Breaks National Monument - completed 1924, demolished 1972
 Bryce Canyon Lodge, Bryce Canyon National Park - completed 1925
 Union Pacific Dining Lodge, West Yellowstone, MT, 1925
 The Ahwahnee, Yosemite National Park - completed 1926
 Union Pacific Railroad depot, South Torrington, Wyoming, 1926
 Zion Lodge - completed 1927, burned 1966, rebuilt (different style, then restored to original appearance in the 1990s)
 Union Pacific Railroad Great Overland Station, 701 N Kansas Avenue, Topeka, Kansas, 1927
 Union Pacific Railroad depot, Lund, Utah, 1927, demolished 1970
 Wilshire Tower (Desmond's and Silverwoods department stores), 5500–5514 Wilshire Boulevard, Los Angeles, California - completed 1929
 Union Pacific Railroad depot, North Second and Broadway, Abilene, Kansas, 1929
 Union Pacific Railroad Depot, Marysville, Kansas, 1929
 Union Pacific Railroad Depot, Main and 10th Streets, Gering, Nebraska, 1929
 Union Pacific Railroad Depot, 304 North Rail Street, Shoshone, Idaho, 1929
 Union Pacific Railroad depot, 7th Avenue between 8th and 10th Streets, Greeley, Colorado, 1930
 Union Station, 801 South 10th Street, Omaha, Nebraska completed 1931 (now housing the Durham Western Heritage Museum)
 Grand Canyon Lodge (North Rim) - completed 1928, burned 1932, rebuilt (modified style, same footprint)
 the Lodge at Sun Valley, Idaho- completed 1936
 U.S. Post Office, Beacon, New York (with Charles Rosen) - completed 1937
 The new San Francisco Mint in San Francisco, California - completed 1937
 the United States Court House in Los Angeles, California - completed 1940
 Rincon Center Post Office in San Francisco, CA - completed 1940
 Jackson Lake Lodge, Grand Teton National Park, Wyoming - completed 1954
 Gilbert Stanley Underwood buildings index

See also
National Park Service Rustic
Rustic architecture

References

External links
 National Park Service biography
 architectural sculpture on Omaha Union Station

20th-century American architects
 
Arts and Crafts architects
Rustic style architects
1890 births
1960 deaths
Architects from Los Angeles
Harvard Graduate School of Design alumni
Yale University alumni
American railway architects